The 1919–20 Divizia A was the eighth season of Divizia A, the top-level football league of Romania.

Final table

References

1919-20
1919–20 in European association football leagues
1919–20 in Romanian football